West's Block is a building in southeast Portland, Oregon listed on the National Register of Historic Places.

Further reading

See also
 National Register of Historic Places listings in Southeast Portland, Oregon

References

External links
 

1883 establishments in Oregon
Buckman, Portland, Oregon
Commercial buildings completed in 1883
Commercial buildings on the National Register of Historic Places in Oregon
Individually listed contributing properties to historic districts on the National Register in Oregon
Italianate architecture in Oregon
National Register of Historic Places in Portland, Oregon
Portland Historic Landmarks